Frank Kramer (born 3 May 1972) is a former German football player and coach who last managed Schalke 04.

Player career
From 1990 to 2005 he played as semi-professional for FC Memmingen, Bayern Munich II, TSV Vestenbergsgreuth, SC Weismain, 1. FC Nürnberg II, Greuther Fürth II (two spells) and 1. SC Feucht.

Managerial career

Early career
Kramer had three stints as Greuther Fürth II manager before moving to 1899 Hoffenheim. At 1899 Hoffenheim, Kramer had two stints as 1899 Hoffenheim II manager. In between stints, Kramer was interim manager of the first team after the sacking of Markus Babbel.

Greuther Fürth
Greuther Fürth appointed Kramer as manager on 12 March 2013.

He was sacked on 23 February 2015.

Fortuna Düsseldorf
On 14 April 2015, it was announced that Kramer would be taking over as manager of Fortuna Düsseldorf from the beginning of the 2015–16 season. He had his first training session on 20 June 2015. He was sacked on 22 November 2015.

Germany youth
He was appointed as the head coach of the Germany U19 national team on 23 August 2016. In the following years, he also managed the U20- and U18 squad.

Red Bull Salzburg
Ahead of the 2019–20 season, Kramer was appointed head of the youth academy at FC Red Bull Salzburg.

Arminia Bielefeld
Kramer became manager of Bundesliga club Arminia Bielefeld on 2 March 2021, succeeding Uwe Neuhaus. He signed a contract until 2023.
After a devastating record of six losses in seven games, Kramer was sacked on 20 April 2022.

Schalke 04
He took over Schalke 04 in June 2022. After Schalke was second to last in the table after ten matchdays and a subsequent 5–1 defeat against 1899 Hoffenheim in the DFB-Pokal, Kramer was sacked on 19 October 2022.

Managerial record

References

External links

Living people
1972 births
People from Memmingen
Sportspeople from Swabia (Bavaria)
Footballers from Bavaria
German footballers
German football managers
Association football midfielders
FC Memmingen players
FC Bayern Munich II players
SpVgg Greuther Fürth players
1. FC Nürnberg II players
SpVgg Greuther Fürth II players
1. SC Feucht players
Bayernliga players
Regionalliga players
SpVgg Greuther Fürth II managers
TSG 1899 Hoffenheim managers
SpVgg Greuther Fürth managers
Fortuna Düsseldorf managers
Arminia Bielefeld managers
FC Schalke 04 managers
Regionalliga managers
3. Liga managers
2. Bundesliga managers
Bundesliga managers
West German footballers